Paul Rutman is a British writer and producer best known for being the writer of historical drama Indian Summers and crime drama Vera.

Filmography

Awards and nominations

BAFTA Awards

2008	Nominated
BAFTA TV Award	Best Drama Serial
Five Days (2007) 
Shared with:
Otto Bathurst 
Simon Curtis 
Gwyneth Hughes

2007	Nominated
BAFTA TV Award	Best Drama Serial
The Virgin Queen (2005) 
Shared with:
Coky Giedroyc 
Paula Milne

Banff Television Festival

2008	Nominated
Banff Rockie Award	Best Mini-Series
Five Days (2007) 
Shared with:
Gwyneth Hughes 
Simon Curtis 
Otto Bathurst 
USA / UK

Broadcasting Press Guild Awards

2008	Nominated
Broadcasting Press Guild Award	Best Drama Series
Five Days (2007) 
Shared with:
Otto Bathurst 
Simon Curtis 
Gwyneth Hughes

References

External links

Living people
British television writers
Showrunners
British male television writers
Year of birth missing (living people)